Ghislain Chikez (or Tshikez) Diemu is a politician in the Democratic Republic of the Congo, and a member of the People's Party for Reconstruction and Democracy, of which he was previously Secretary General. He joined the AFDL in 1997 and was appointed Vice-Minister of the Interior by Joseph Kabila, and later on, Secretary General of the PPRD.

He was also previously Vice-Governor of Katanga province for economic affairs.

Since 6 February 2007, he has served as Minister of Defense and Veterans' Affairs (Anciens Combattants), supervising the FARDC, in the government of Antoine Gizenga. However President Kabila distrusts the official military structure in Kinshasa and prefers to give instructions directly to the commanders in the east. He was replaced by another politician, Charles Mwando Nsimba in October 2008.

References

External links 
 https://web.archive.org/web/20110706173702/http://www.congolite.ca/doc41.htm

Living people
Defence ministers of the Democratic Republic of the Congo
People's Party for Reconstruction and Democracy politicians
Year of birth missing (living people)
21st-century Democratic Republic of the Congo people